The Melville is a skyscraper located at 1189 Melville Street in the Coal Harbour neighbourhood of the city's downtown core of Vancouver, British Columbia, Canada. The building is the sixth tallest building in the city. The Melville is also the tallest fully residential building in Western Canada. There is also a smaller building as part of the complex, which serves as a hotel. The hotel is under the Loden brand, a boutique hotel chain.

See also
List of tallest buildings in Vancouver

References

External links
City of Vancouver Development Permit Board report.
The Melville at emporis.com

Skyscrapers in Vancouver
Hotels in Vancouver
Residential buildings completed in 2007
Residential skyscrapers in Canada
2007 establishments in British Columbia